The  Little League World Series took place between August 23 and August 27 in Williamsport, Pennsylvania. American Little League of Levittown, Pennsylvania, defeated North East Optimist Club Little League of Fort Worth, Texas, in the championship game of the 14th Little League World Series. Joe Mormello Jr. tossed a no-hitter, striking out 16 batters in the final game en route to a 5–0 shutout.

Teams

Championship bracket

Consolation bracket

External links
1960 Little League World Series
Line scores for the 1960 LLWS

Little League World Series
Little League World Series
Little League World Series